G. Pullaiah College of Engineering and Technology (GPCET) is a college situated in Pasupula, just outside Kurnool, Andhra Pradesh, India. It was established in 2007 by G. Pullaiah. The college is approved by the All India Council for Technical Education and affiliated to Jawaharlal Nehru Technological University, Anantapur.
It offers BTech courses in five subjects:
Electronics and communication engineering
Electrical and electronics engineering
Computer science and engineering
Mechanical engineering
Civil Engineering
It also has an MBA programme.

External links
Official website

Engineering colleges in Andhra Pradesh
Universities and colleges in Kurnool district
Kurnool
Educational institutions established in 2007
2007 establishments in Andhra Pradesh